One Night in Melbourne is a live album by Australian singer songwriter James Reyne. The album was recorded live in Esplanade Hotel (Melbourne) in 5 September 2007, during the promotion of the Ghost Ships album and released as a CD/DVD set.

Track listing
CD
 "Fall Of Rome" - 5:24
 "Slave" - 4:08
 "Hammerhead" - 4:08
 "Reckless" - 3:15
 "Reno" - 3:26
 "Sammy and Doofus and Our Man In New York" - 3:11
 "Little Criminals" - 4:13
 "Little Man You've Had a Busy Day" - 4:01
 "Mr Froggy Went a Courtin'" - 2:57
 "Broken Romeo" - 2:47
 "Motor's Too Fast" - 3:42
 "Water Water" - 4:33
 "Superannuated Idol" - 2:11
 "Political Science" - 1:52
 "Harvest Moon" - 4:25
 "The Rainbow's Dead End" - 4:18
 "Errol" - 3:49
 "Oh No Not You Again" - 5:20
 "The Boys Light Up" - 3:58

DVD
 "Fall Of Rome"	
 "Slave" 	
 "Mr International"	
 "Hammerhead"	
 "Light In The Tunnel"	
 "Beautiful People"	
 "Reckless"	
 "Reno" 
 "Sammy and Doofus and Our Man In New York"	
 "Little Criminals"	
 "One More River"	
 "Little Man You've Had a Busy Day"	
 "How To Make Gravy"	
 "Way Out West"	
 "The Postman"	
 "Mr Froggy Went a Courtin'"
 "Broken Romeo"	
 "Motor's Too Fast"
 "I'm a Man"	
 "Water Water"	
 "Motor City"	
 "Superannuated Idol"	
 "Political Science"
 "Downhearted"	
 "Harvest Moon"	
 "The Rainbow's Dead End"	
 "Errol"	
 "Oh No Not You Again"	
 "The Boy's Light Up"	
 "Daughters Of The Northern Coast"	
 Bonus Feature: Exclusive Interview

Release history

Credits
 Bass – Rexx Fernandez
 Drums – John Watson
 Guitar, Vocals – Brett Kingman
 Vocals – Tracy Kingman

References

James Reyne albums
2007 live albums
Live albums by Australian artists